This is a list of prime ministers of Mali since the country gained independence from France in 1960 to the present day.

A total of seventeen people have served as Prime Minister of Mali (not counting five acting prime ministers). Additionally, one person, Modibo Keita, served on two non-consecutive occasions.

The current Interim Prime Minister of Mali is Choguel Kokalla Maïga, since 6 June 2021. He was appointed by the National Committee for the Salvation of the People, which has governed the country since the 2021 Malian coup d'état.

Key
Political parties

Other factions

Status

List of officeholders

See also
 Politics of Mali
 List of heads of state of Mali
 Vice President of Mali
 First Lady of Mali
 List of colonial governors of Mali

Notes

References

External links
 La Primature
 World Statesmen – Mali

Mali
Political history of Mali
Government of Mali
 
1960 establishments in Mali
Prime ministers
Prime ministers